The Maple School District is a public school district in Douglas County, Wisconsin, United States, based in Maple, Wisconsin.

Schools
The Maple School District has two elementary schools, one middle school, and one high school.

Elementary schools 
Iron River Elementary School
Northwestern Elementary School

Middle school
Northwestern Middle School

High school
Northwestern High School

References

External links

Education in Douglas County, Wisconsin
School districts in Wisconsin